Issacharoff is a surname. Notable people with the surname include:

 Avi Issacharoff (born 1973), Israeli journalist known for his focus on Palestinian affairs
 Jeremy Issacharoff (born 1955), Israeli diplomat
 Samuel Issacharoff (born 1954), American law professor